Reuil-en-Brie (literally Reuil in Brie) is a commune in the Seine-et-Marne department in the Île-de-France region in north-central France.

The settlement grew up around the monastery founded by Rado, a mayor of the palace of Burgundy, in about 630, which from his name was called Radolium. In later times it was a priory of Cluny.

Population
The inhabitants are called  Reuillois.

See also
Communes of the Seine-et-Marne department

References

Communes of Seine-et-Marne